The Milton Menace are a Junior "A" ice hockey team from  Milton, Ontario. They play in the North-West Conference of the Ontario Junior Hockey League. In March 2019, the OJHL announced Jason Tryfon's purchase of the Newmarket Hurricanes franchise and its move to Milton.

References

Ice hockey teams
Ontario Provincial Junior A Hockey League teams
Ice hockey teams in Ontario